James Peter "Kelly" Robinson (1876 – 26 November 1943) was an Australian rules footballer who played for the Fitzroy Football Club in the Victorian Football League (VFL).

Family
The son of George Robinson, and Mary Robinson, née Higgins, James Peter Robinson was born at Tooborac, Victoria in 1876.

He married Teresa Florence Skinner (1881-1956) in 1907.

Football
Robinson was recruited to Fitzroy from the Collingwood Imperials. He was a wingman in Fitzroy's 1898 and 1899 premierships and also played in their losing 1900 Grand Final team.

At one stage in his career he played in 19 consecutive wins. Robinson kicked just one goal in his career, against Collingwood, in the opening game of the 1900 season.

Death
He died at the Austin Hospital, in Heidelberg, Melbourne on 26 November 1943.

See also
 The Footballers' Alphabet
 1898 VFL Grand Final
 1899 VFL Grand Final
 1900 VFL Grand Final

Notes

References
 'Follower', "The Footballers' Alphabet", The Leader, (Saturday, 23 July 1898), p.17.
 Holmesby, Russell and Main, Jim (2007). The Encyclopedia of AFL Footballers. 7th ed. Melbourne: Bas Publishing.
 Victorian Football League Premiers for 1899, The Weekly Times, (Saturday, 23 September 1899), p.11 (Kelly Robinson is second from the right in the front row).

External links
 
 James Robinson, at AustralianFootbal.com

Australian rules footballers from Victoria (Australia)
Fitzroy Football Club players
Fitzroy Football Club Premiership players
1876 births
1943 deaths
Two-time VFL/AFL Premiership players